Łoje-Awissa  is a village in the administrative district of Gmina Radziłów, within Grajewo County, Podlaskie Voivodeship, in north-eastern Poland.

The village has a population of 173.

References

External link

Villages in Grajewo County